Manjusha Museum is situated in the holy town of Dharmasthala in Karnataka state, India. It houses a good collection of objects, antiques, paintings, artifacts, temple chariots, vintage and classic cars. These were collected from temples across Karnataka. The  museum is located to the south of the famous Lord Manjunatha temple.

Owner and Curator
Veerendra Heggade, Dharmadhikari of Dharmasthala, privately owns this heritage museum and houses his collection from over 35 years. P.R.Thippeswamy, a renowned artist and folklorist from Mysore was instrumental in the development of this museum. Some of late Thippeswamy's paintings are prominently displayed in the museum as an honour to him. It was due to the combined effort of these two people that led to the establishment of the museum.

Since the museum has been adding and improvising collection of mankind.
Manjusha Museum has two units of Museum. 
1.	Manjusha Car museum (The Museum of cars)
2.	Manjusha Vastu Sangrahalaya (A newly open vast variety of the encyclopedic collection)

Collection
The museum preserves terracotta coins from Mauryan period, dating around 1st century BC, an ancient book containing the accounts of the Manjunatha Swamy temple, a 300 yr old Veena, a musical instrument of Vidhwan Veene Sheshanna. It has a vast collection of Indian stone and metal sculpture, paintings, items of jewellery, objects of worship and utilitarian objects created by the craftsmen of the coastal area. Different size cameras.

The museum also houses a unique collection of 6000 palm leaf manuscripts.

References

External links
 Temple Website

Museums in Karnataka
Buildings and structures in Dakshina Kannada district
Education in Dakshina Kannada district
Tourist attractions in Dakshina Kannada district